Brendon Small's Galaktikon is the first solo album debut by Brendon Small, known for his work on the animated television shows Metalocalypse and Home Movies, and as creator of virtual death metal band, Dethklok. The album features Dethklok members Gene Hoglan and Bryan Beller, on drums and bass, respectively. Small described the album as a "high-stakes, intergalactic, extreme rock album" and describes it as being similar to Dethklok but with more rock elements and melodic vocals. Like on previous Dethklok albums, Ulrich Wild produced the album and Antonio Canobbio designed the cover art. The album's release coincided with the premiere of the fourth season of Metalocalypse. The album was also released on vinyl in late June 2012.

Production
The writing process started when Brendon Small had the studio lined up and Gene Hoglan and Bryan Beller ready to begin work on the second Dethklok album, but the legal negotiations were at a standstill. So in the meantime he decided to write a solo album since he and the band were ready but had nothing to record.

The song "Dangertits" is an instrumental which Small says is a tribute to shredder guitarists like Steve Vai, Yngwie Malmsteen and Steve Morse.

Concept
Small stated that the album was written to act as an "audio comic book," in chronological order. The album follows a super hero who has just gone through a "very messy, public, intergalactic divorce," but his ex-wife gets kidnapped, so he attempts to rescue her only to find out that she is dating the antagonist.

Story
The album is about a superhero called Triton. At the start of the story, he receives his divorce papers from his ex-wife and takes an angry drive through space to try and cool off ("Triton"). Triton then goes to a therapist, a Lazer Witch, to see what his next step in life should be. As it so happens, the Lazer Witch is also a soothsayer. During their sessions, the Lazer Witch foresees danger and warns Triton not to attempt to save his ex-wife if she gets in trouble ("Prophecy of the Lazer Witch").

Meanwhile, Triton's arch enemy, Beastblade, escapes from prison and swears revenge on Triton ("Beastblade"). Beastblade seduces Triton's ex-wife and has sex with her ("Deathwaltz"). Triton finds out about their get-together and knows that she is in danger and contemplates whether or not to save her ("Truth Orb and the Kill Pool").

He ultimately decides to save her, but gets kidnapped by Space Pirates as he tries to reach her. Triton is taken to a planet where a corrupt government runs gladiatorial games.  There, he and the other slaves are forced to fight a giant worm. Meanwhile, his ex-wife realizes that she is in danger as Beastblade reveals that he plans to kill her and then Triton ("You Can't Run Away").

Triton unites his fellow slaves in the arena and defeats the giant worm. They then turn against their masters and the crowd ("Arena War of the Immortal Masters"). A large space battle ensues as Triton destroys the Space Pirates and the government that ran the arena games.

Afterward, Triton rushes to save his ex-wife ("Dangertits"). Triton has his final confrontation with Beastblade and kills him. Saving his ex-wife one last time, Triton and his ex-wife part ways ("On My Way").

Release and background
Upon release the album was available for purchase exclusively on Brendon Small's website, and later as a digital download on iTunes and Amazon. The album sold poorly in the first week of sales, selling only about 1,206 copies.

There was no tour to support the album and was only played live once (in its entirety) at "WesFest" 8 on March 3, 2013 in West Hollywood, California.

Adaption
The story of the album was adapted into a six-part comic book series. Issue #1 was released on August 2, 2017. The comics were written by Brendon Small and Eric Powell.

Sequel

On May 16, 2016, Brendon Small teased the follow up to Galaktikon on his Twitter which was followed by an announcement later on that day. The album was released on August 25, 2017.

Reception

Under The Gun Review gave the album an 8 out of 10. In the review they stated that "You’ll find no shortage of triumphant guitar licks and grand stories on this album."

Track listing

Personnel
Brendon Small – vocals, guitar, keyboards, producer
Bryan Beller – bass
Gene Hoglan – drums

Production
Ulrich Wild – production, engineering, mixing
All drums recorded at "BOMB SHELTER" Studios, all other instruments and vocals recorded at Brendon Smalls "THE DANGER ZONE" 
Antonio Canobbio – album cover art
Michael Mesker – design & art adaptation

References

External links

Official Facebook page

2012 debut albums
Concept albums
Albums produced by Ulrich Wild
Self-released albums
Galaktikon